Baddeley Park is a sports stadium in Cessnock, New South Wales, Australia and is part of Baddeley Park Regional Sporting Centre.

References

External links
Australia Stadiums - Baddeley Park reviews
Jets bring pre-season cup to Cessnock. Cessnock Advertiser, Australia - 15 Jul 2008

Sports venues in New South Wales